Ilse Schoors (born 25 July 1961) is a Belgian former breaststroke swimmer. She competed in two events at the 1976 Summer Olympics.

References

External links
 

1961 births
Living people
Belgian female breaststroke swimmers
Olympic swimmers of Belgium
Swimmers at the 1976 Summer Olympics
Swimmers from Antwerp